Antonio Bryant (born March 9, 1981) is a former American football wide receiver in the National Football League (NFL).  He played college football for University of Pittsburgh, and was recognized as an All-American and Fred Biletnikoff Award winner.  The Dallas Cowboys picked him in the second round of the 2002 NFL Draft, and he played professionally for the Cleveland Browns, San Francisco 49ers and Tampa Bay Buccaneers of the NFL.

Early years
Bryant was born in Miami, Florida and graduated from Miami Northwestern High School, where he was a standout high school football player for the Bulls. He was selected as a team captain in three straight years and helped lead his team as a senior to a Class 6A state title and an undefeated record (16-0).

College career
Bryant attended the University of Pittsburgh, and played for the Pittsburgh Panthers football team from 1999 to 2001. He was a first-team All-Big East selection in 2000 and 2001, and was recognized as a consensus first-team All-American as a sophomore in 2000.  He also won the Fred Biletnikoff Award as the best college wide receiver in America in 2000; he was the second sophomore to win the award (after Randy Moss). He declared for the NFL Draft after his junior year, leaving as the conference's record holder for regular-season touchdowns (26) and 100-yard receiving games (13).

Professional career

Dallas Cowboys
Bryant was selected by the Dallas Cowboys in the second round (63rd overall) of the 2002 NFL Draft, after dropping because of character concerns. He was given number 88 with the expectation of developing into a great player and was the first rookie wide receiver to start in a season opener since Michael Irvin. At the time, his 44 receptions ranked third, his 733 receiving yards ranked fourth and his 6 touchdown receptions ranked second all-time for a Cowboys rookie in a season. On October 13, he had his signature moment against the Carolina Panthers on a 4th and 14, last minute game-winning acrobatic touchdown reception from quarterback Quincy Carter.

In 2003, he was moved to third receiver after Terry Glenn was signed as a free agent.

In 2004, the arrival of free agent Keyshawn Johnson started to affect his attitude. During a mini-camp practice after being unsatisfied with the number of reps he had, he started cursing and threw his jersey aiming at Bill Parcells head, before the team broke up the fight. Although Parcells gave him a second chance, tensions kept escalating from that point forward. He was eventually traded to the Cleveland Browns after the fifth game of the season, in exchange for wide receiver Quincy Morgan, who also had issues with his team.

Cleveland Browns
In 2005, he had his best season up to that point, leading the team in catches (69), receiving yards (1,009 yards) and touchdowns (four). He became a free agent at the end of the year.

San Francisco 49ers
Bryant signed as a free agent with the San Francisco 49ers in 2006. On March 1, 2007, he was released one year after he signed a four-year, $14 million contract.

Reinstatement
On September 17, 2007, Bryant was reinstated by the league, but was not able to sign with a team, partly because of a failed drug test over the summer. In October, he filed a lawsuit against the NFL to try to get them to stop drug testing him since he was not a player at the time, and to drop the failed drug test. In December, the case was resolved without the details being released.

Tampa Bay Buccaneers
After not playing the previous year, on March 10, 2008, Bryant signed a deal for the veteran minimum with the Tampa Bay Buccaneers. He had a career game against the Carolina Panthers, finishing with 9 receptions for 200 yards, including a one-handed touchdown catch dubbed "catch of the year". Despite his performance, the Buccaneers lost 38-23. Bryant finished his best season as a pro with 83 catches for 1,248 yards and 7 touchdowns while averaging 15 yards per catch. He became the team's leading receiver and the second player in franchise history to record three or more consecutive 100-yard receiving games. On February 18, 2009, he was given the franchise tag by the Buccaneers. On February 25, 2010, he was waived after a somewhat disappointing and injury-plagued season.

Cincinnati Bengals
After finishing an injury-plagued season and coming off surgery to repair cartilage damage in his left knee, the Cincinnati Bengals signed Bryant on March 10, 2010, to a four-year contract worth a reported $28 million, along with multiple incentives.

After the Bengals signed Terrell Owens, Bryant gave up his No. 81 jersey for Owens, who had worn the number his entire career.  In return for the number, Bryant requested Owens make a donation to his charity and wore jersey No. 19 instead. After struggling in practices and not being able to play in any of the pre-season games because of problems with his left knee, the Bengals released him on August 29.

Seattle Seahawks
On June 12, 2012, Bryant worked out for the Seattle Seahawks by attending their three-day mini-camp and took a physical for the team as well. On June 15, 2012, it was reported that he finished all three of the minicamp practices, indicating that his chronic knee injury had healed. After being out of football for two years, Bryant signed with the Seahawks on July 26. His stay with the team was short lived, as he was released on August 5.

NFL career statistics

References

External links
Cincinnati Bengals bio

1981 births
Living people
All-American college football players
American football wide receivers
Cleveland Browns players
Dallas Cowboys players
Pittsburgh Panthers football players
Players of American football from Miami
San Francisco 49ers players
Miami Northwestern Senior High School alumni
Tampa Bay Buccaneers players
Cincinnati Bengals players
Seattle Seahawks players